Moluccella is a genus of annual and short-lived perennial plants native to Central and Southwestern Asia and the Mediterranean. They are tall, upright, branched plants growing to 1 meter or more with toothed leaves and small white fragrant flowers.

Species
 Moluccella aucheri (Boiss.) Scheen - Iran, Pakistan
 Moluccella bucharica (B.Fedtsch.) Ryding - Uzbekistan
 Moluccella fedtschenkoana (Kudr.) Ryding - Uzbekistan and Tajikistan
 Moluccella laevis L. - Bells of Ireland - Turkmenistan, Iran, Iraq, Caucasus, Cyprus, Syria, Lebanon, Palestine, Turkey; naturalized in scattered locations in Europe, Africa, and North America
 Moluccella olgae (Regel) Ryding - Uzbekistan, Tajikistan and Kyrgyzstan
 Moluccella otostegioides Prain - Pakistan
 Moluccella sogdiana (Kudr.) Ryding - Uzbekistan, Tajikistan
 Moluccella spinosa L. - Mediterranean from Spain + Algeria to Turkey + Palestine

Cultivation

Marginally frost hardy, these plants prefer full sun and moderately fertile, moist but well-drained soil.  Propagation is from seed.

References

Lamiaceae
Lamiaceae genera
Taxa named by Carl Linnaeus